Pereš is a borough (city ward) of the city of Košice, Slovakia. It's one of the smaller boroughs of its district and consists mainly of housing.

History 

One of the younger boroughs of the city, the first written record of Pereš dates back to 1937.

Statistics
 Area: 
 Population: 1,939 (31 December 2017)
 Density of population: 1,500/km2 (31 December 2017)
 District: Košice II
 Mayor: Jozef Karabin (as of 2018 elections)

Gallery

References

External links

 Official website of the Pereš borough
 Article on the Pereš borough at Cassovia.sk
 Official website of the town of Košice

Boroughs of Košice